Untamed Heiress is a 1954 American comedy film directed by Charles Lamont, written by Barry Shipman and starring Judy Canova, Don "Red" Barry, George Cleveland, Taylor Holmes, Chick Chandler and Jack Kruschen. It was released on April 1, 1954, by Republic Pictures.

Plot

Cast      
Judy Canova as Judy
Don "Red" Barry as 'Spider' Mike Lawrence 
George Cleveland as Andrew 'Cactus' Clayton
Taylor Holmes as Walter Martin
Chick Chandler as Eddie Taylor
Jack Kruschen as Louie
Hugh Sanders as Williams
Douglas Fowley as Pal
William Haade as Friend
Ellen Corby as Mrs. Flanny

References

External links 
 

1954 films
American comedy films
1954 comedy films
Republic Pictures films
Films directed by Charles Lamont
American black-and-white films
1950s English-language films
1950s American films